In Hindu ancient epic  there were three elephants by the name Supratika. The foremost among them is listed as one of the Diggajas, each representing the eight quarters. The Hindu epic Mahabharata describes two more elephants by the same name – an elephant that was an incarnation of a sage, and the one that belonged to Bhagadatta, the king of Pragjyotisha.

Supratika (Diggaja)
The Amarakosha, a thesaurus of Sanskrit, mentions the names of eight male elephants, that bear the world together, as Airavata, Pundarika, Vamana, Kumunda, Anjana, Pushpa-danta, Sarva-bhauma, and Supratika. Supratika represents the north-east direction, the quarter of Soma. Anjanavati is believed to be the wife of Supratika.

Vibhvasu and Supratik
The story about two brothers – Vibhavasu and Supratik – is told in the Adi Parva of the Mahabharata. The elder one, Vibhavasu, was susceptible to anger, while the younger one, Supratik, was seeking to partition their wealth. One day both brothers were involved in a quarrel with each other. In the end, Vibhavasu then cursed Supratik saying, he will take birth as an elephant in the next life. In return, Supratik cursed his brother saying, he will be born as a tortoise. Anger and greed caused them to be born as animals in their next birth. Their hostility continues in their next birth as well. One day these two animals were seized by Garuda, who took them in his claws to a mountain and ate them. Garuda killed them on the advice of his father Kashyapa.

Supratika (Bhagadatta's elephant)

On the twelfth day of the Kurukshetra War, Duryodhana sent a large elephant division against Bhima. Bhima killed all the elephants with his mace. This created a havoc among the Kaurava army and they fled for their life in all directions. Angered by this, the king of Pragjyotisha, Bhagadatta, seated on Supratika, charged against Bhima. The elephant rushed forward and crushed Bhima's chariot into pieces, killing his charioteer and horses. But Bhima escaped destruction by jumping off his chariot. He got underneath the elephant and severed its vital points causing exceeding pain. Enraged at this, the elephant got mad and tried to throw him off. In an instant, it caught Bhima with its trunk and was about to crush him under the knees. But Bhima managed to escape from its hold and again got underneath the elephant and in between its limbs and started attacking it. Bhima was hopeful that another elephant from the Pandava side would come for his rescue in the meanwhile. But when he got underneath the elephant for the second time, hiding in between its legs, the Kaurava army thought he had been slain by the beast.

Yudhishthira, Bhima's elder brother, was struck in grief and urged his forces to destroy Bhagadatta and Supratika. The king of Dasarna charged against them. In the great battle that took place between Supratika and Dasarna's elephant, Supratika crushed Dasarna's elephant to death. Utilising his time, Bhima emerged from beneath Supratika and fled. The Pandava army was relieved when they saw Bhima alive.

Supratika was later killed the same day, by Arjuna's arrows. Arjuna, a while later, also killed Bhagadutta.

References

Hindu legendary creatures
Mythological elephants
Elephants in Indian culture
Elephants in Hinduism